The Hans Oeschger Medal is an award bestowed by the European Geosciences Union (EGU) to recognise scientists who have made "outstanding achievements in ice research and/or short term climatic changes (past, present, future)." The award was established by the European Geophysical Society (EGS) in recognition of the scientific achievements of Professor Hans Oeschger. It was awarded by the EGS in 2002 and 2003, and subsequently by the EGU.

List of recipients
Source: European Geosciences Union

See also

 List of geophysics awards

References

Geophysics awards